Raphaël "Rafi" Mathieu (born 18 October 1983) is a French curler from Chamonix, France.

Career
Mathieu has participated in four World Championships (and ). All three teams he has played as the Alternate for Team Dufour, their best performance was fifth in 2008.

Based on the points they accumulated at their three world championship appearances from 2007 to 2009 Team France qualified a team to the 2010 Vancouver Olympics where they finished in seventh place.

Outside of curling he works as an excavator driver.

Teams

References

External links

1983 births
Living people
People from Chamonix
Sportspeople from La Tronche
Sportspeople from Haute-Savoie
French male curlers
Curlers at the 2010 Winter Olympics
Olympic curlers of France